News23 was the first primetime newscast and one of the first local programs aired over Studio 23, which was aired from October 14, 1996, to September 18, 1998, and was replaced by News Central.

Anchors
 Nancy Irlanda (1996–1998)
 Lori Bautista (1996–1997)
 Joseph Barrios (1996–1997)
 Frankie Evangelista (1997–1998)
 Jennifer Reyes (1997–1998)

Reporters
 Erwin Temperante
 Mylene Mariano-Rivera 
 Daphne Oseña-Paez
 Cathy Salceda

See also
 List of Philippine television shows
 List of programs aired by Studio 23

Studio 23 news shows
Studio 23 original programming
1990s Philippine television series
1996 Philippine television series debuts
1998 Philippine television series endings
English-language television shows